From 1906 to 1926, the Finnish Swimming Federation did not arrange a dedicated national competition, but spread out the hosting duties of the championship events to multiple clubs.

Artistic swimming

Men 
Competed in Helsinki on 6 (technical routine) and 7 (free routine) August 1921.

Source:

Women 
Competed in Vyborg on 23 (technical routine) and 24 (free routine) July 1921.

Source:

Diving

Men

Plain 
Competed in Helsinki on 29 (qualification) and 31 (final) July 1921.

Final 

Source:

Platform 
Competed in Helsinki on 30 and 31 July 1921.

Source:

Springboard 
Competed in Helsinki on 29 and 30 July 1921.

Source:

Women

Platform 
Competed in Vyborg on 24 July 1921.

Source:

Swimming

Men

100 metre freestyle 
Competed in Helsinki on 31 July 1921.

Source:

200 metre freestyle 
Competed in Helsinki on 30 July 1921.

Source:

500 metre freestyle 
Competed in Helsinki on 6 August 1921.

Source:

1000 metre freestyle 
Competed in Helsinki on 7 August 1921.

Source:

100 metre backstroke 
Competed in Turku on 24 July 1921.

Source:

200 metre breaststroke 
Competed in Turku on 24 July 1921.

Source:

100 metre life saving 
Competed in Turku on 24 July 1921.

Source:

4 × 50 metre freestyle relay 
Competed in Helsinki on 29 July 1921.

Source:

4 × 100 metre freestyle relay 
Competed in Helsinki on 30 July 1921.

Source:

Women

50 metre freestyle 
Competed in Vyborg on 24 July 1921 (heats and final).

Final 

Source:

100 metre freestyle 
Competed in Vyborg on 23 July 1921.

Source:

500 metre freestyle 
Competed in Vyborg on 23 July 1921.

Source:

100 metre breaststroke 
Competed in Vyborg on 24 July 1921.

Source:

4 × 50 metre freestyle relay 
Competed in Vyborg on 23 July 1921.

Source:

Water polo

Men 

 semi-finals:
 Helsinki, 3 August 1921: Helsingfors Simsällskap–Helsingin Uimarit 6–2
 Tampere, 14 August 1921: Tampereen Uimaseura–Viipurin Uimaseura 6–1
 final:
 Helsinki, 21 August 1921: Helsingfors Simsällskap–Tampereen Uimaseura 8–0

Sources

References 

National swimming competitions
National championships in Finland
Swimming competitions in Finland
1921 in Finnish sport
1921 in water sports
Diving competitions in Finland
Water polo competitions
Synchronised swimming competitions